The 1954–55 season was Fussball Club Basel 1893's 61st season in their existence. It was their ninth consecutive season in the top flight of Swiss football after their promotion from the Nationalliga B the season 1945–46. They played their home games in the Landhof, in the Wettstein Quarter in Kleinbasel. Jules Düblin was the club's chairman. It was his ninth successive season as chairman.

Overview 
René Bader continued as the team's player-coach, for the third consecutive season with Willy Dürr as his assistant. However, in this season Bader only played in one test match. Basel played a total of 43 games during their 1954–55 season. Of these 43 matches 26 were in the domestic league, three matches were in the Swiss Cup and 14 were test or friendly matches. The test/friendly games resulted with five victories, two were drawn and seven matches ended with a defeat. In total, including the test games and the cup competition, 17 games were won, six were drawn and 20 were lost. In their 41 games they scored 101 goals and conceded 98. 

There were fourteen teams contesting in the 1954–55 Nationalliga A, the last two teams in the table were to be relegated. Basel won 10 of their 26 games and drew four times and lost 12 times. They scored 47 goals and conceded 52. Basel ended the championship with 24 points in 9th position. They were 18 points behind La Chaux-de-Fonds who won the Swiss Championship for the second time in a row. Thun and Luzern suffered relegation. Josef Hügi was Basel's top league goal scorer with 20 goals and he was third top goal scorer in the league behind Marcel Mauron from La Chaux-de-Fonds who had scored 30 times. Bannwart was Basel's second best goal scorer with eight goals. Further, Hansueli Oberer scored five and Juan Monros netted four times.

Basel joined the Swiss Cup in the third principal round. They were drawn away against lower tier local team FC Riehen, but the match was played at the Landhof and Basel won 6–0. In the fourth round they were drawn at home to lower tier FC Olten and Basel won 2–0. In the fifth round Basel were drawn at home to Zürich. But here they were knocked out of the competition

Players 
The following is the list of the Basel first team squad during the season 1954–55. The list includes players that were in the squad on the day that the Nationalliga A season started on 29 August 1954 but subsequently left the club after that date.

 

 

 

Players who left the squad

Results 
Legend

Friendly matches

Pre-season and mid-season

Winter break to end of season

Nationalliga A

League matches

League table

Swiss Cup

See also
 History of FC Basel
 List of FC Basel players
 List of FC Basel seasons

References

Sources 
 Die ersten 125 Jahre. Publisher: Josef Zindel im Friedrich Reinhardt Verlag, Basel. 
 The FCB team 1954–55 at fcb-archiv.ch
 Switzerland 1954–55 by Erik Garin at Rec.Sport.Soccer Statistics Foundation

External links
 FC Basel official site

FC Basel seasons
Basel